Aldham is a village and civil parish in Essex, England. The village is in the borough of Colchester and in the parliamentary constituency of Harwich and North Essex. The village has its own parish council.

The village borders Fordstreet, Marks Tey and the River Colne to the north.

The 2001 census gave the parish population as 513, decreasing to 491 at the 2011 census.

History

There have been Iron Age finds in the area near Fordstreet and also pottery that may indicate Roman settlement. The village was founded in the Middle Ages, and by the time of the Domesday Book of 1086 there was a population of 12 with four households. The population rose in the late sixteenth and seventeenth centuries and by 1671 there were at least 55 households in the village.

Church
Aldham's parish church is dedicated to St Margaret and St Catherine and is a Grade II* listed building. The church is first mentioned in 1145. The original church stood by Old Church Farm to the west of the village. By the middle of the 19th century, it had become very decrepit; the floor was damp, the walls had to be supported by large brick buttresses, and stout wooden posts had replaced some of the pillars. In 1853, it was decided to build a new church in a more central location, modelled on the old one (but enlarged) and re-using as much of the original fabric as possible, notably the whole of the 14th-century south porch. Although located near the geographical centre of the parish, only a few cottages were in close proximity to the new church, with the majority of the buildings in the parish on the main road at Fordstreet. However, since that time, there has been much building near the church and the area has become known as "Aldham Village" to differentiate it from Fordstreet. Since 1951, the parish has been held jointly with Marks Tey.

Notable residents
Philip Morant - historian of Essex, was Rector from 1745 to 1770. His profile appears on the village sign.
Damon Albarn (1968- ) - musician, lead singer of Blur and co-creator of "virtual" rock band Gorillaz spent part of his childhood in Aldham.

References

External links

 

Villages in Essex
Borough of Colchester